The 2009 Busan Open Challenger Tennis was a professional tennis tournament played on outdoor hard courts. It is part of the 2009 ATP Challenger Tour. It took place in Busan, South Korea between May 11 and May 17, 2009.

Single entrants

Seeds

Rankings are as of May 4, 2009.

Other entrants
The following players received wildcards into the singles main draw:
  An Jae-sung
  Lim Yong-kyu
  Jeong Suk-young
  Seo Yong-bum

The following players received entry from the qualifying draw:
  Cho Soong-jae
  Kim Sun-yong
  Hiroki Kondo
  Gouichi Motomura

Champions

Singles

 Danai Udomchoke def.  Blaž Kavčič, 6–2, 6–2

Doubles

 Sanchai Ratiwatana /  Sonchat Ratiwatana def.  Tasuku Iwami /  Toshihide Matsui, 6–4, 6–2

References
2009 Draws
Official website
ITF search 

Busan Open Challenger Tennis
Busan
Busan Open
May 2009 sports events in South Korea